Odites notosticta is a moth in the family Depressariidae. It was described by Edward Meyrick in 1925. It is found in Cameroon.

The wingspan is about 19 mm. The forewings are yellow whitish with a cloudy grey spot on the dorsum at one-third. The discal stigmata are small, suffused and light yellowish grey. The hindwings are whitish.

References

Moths described in 1925
Odites
Taxa named by Edward Meyrick